The Orthodox Study Bible (OSB) is an Eastern Orthodox study Bible published by Thomas Nelson in 2008. It features an English translation of the St. Athanasius Academy Septuagint edition for the Old Testament, and utilizes the New King James Version for the New Testament.  This publication is not an official text of the Eastern Orthodox Church.

Characteristics

Response
The work has received positive endorsements from such prominent bishops as Metropolitan Maximos of Pittsburgh (Greek Orthodox Archdiocese of America), Metropolitan Phillip (Antiochian Orthodox Church) and Metropolitan Theodosius (Orthodox Church in America).

Among the work's critics, Archimandrite Ephrem, writing in the Orthodox Christian journal Sourozh, has stated that the commentary "feels far too much like a piece of evangelical propaganda decked out in the trappings of Orthodoxy."  Priest Seraphim Johnson has written in The Orthodox Christian Witness that "the Study Bible reproduces the whole textual apparatus of the NKJV, including many of the doubtful decisions of modern non-Orthodox biblical scholarship."

See also

References

External links
  Orthodox Study Bible app (iPhone, iPod touch)
 Podcast interview with Father Peter Gilquist on the OSB

2008 non-fiction books
2008 in Christianity
Bible translations into English
Eastern Orthodoxy
Study Bibles